The 2014 NBL season was the 33rd season of the National Basketball League. The Canterbury Rams returned to the league in 2014 after a five-year hiatus.

The 2014 pre-season tournament was held at the Te Rauparaha Arena in Porirua on Saturday 22 March and Sunday 23 March. The Manawatu Jets were the only team to go undefeated over the two days, finishing with a 4–0 record.

In 2014, the NBL Final Four made a triumphant return to Wellington. The Final Four weekend was held at TSB Bank Arena, with the semifinals on Friday 4 July, followed by the championship game on Saturday 5 July.

Team information

Summary

Regular season standings

Final Four

Awards

Player of the Week

Rookie of the Week

Statistics leaders
Stats as of the end of the regular season

Regular season
 Most Valuable Player: Corey Webster (Wellington Saints)
 NZ Most Valuable Player: Corey Webster (Wellington Saints)
 Most Outstanding Guard: Corey Webster (Wellington Saints)
 Most Outstanding NZ Guard: Corey Webster (Wellington Saints)
 Most Outstanding Forward: Suleiman Braimoh (Taranaki Mountainairs)
 Most Outstanding NZ Forward/Centre: Duane Bailey (Super City Rangers)
 Scoring Champion: Jason Cadee (Super City Rangers)
 Rebounding Champion: Nick Horvath (Manawatu Jets)
 Assist Champion: Mark Dickel (Otago Nuggets)
 Rookie of the Year: Richie Edwards (Canterbury Rams)
 Coach of the Year: Tab Baldwin (Hawke's Bay Hawks)
 All-Star Five:
 G: Jason Cadee (Super City Rangers)
 G: Corey Webster (Wellington Saints)
 F: Dustin Scott (Hawke's Bay Hawks)
 F: Suleiman Braimoh (Taranaki Mountainairs)
 C: Jamal Boykin (Nelson Giants)

Final Four
 Final Four MVP: Lindsay Tait (Wellington Saints)

References

External links
 Basketball New Zealand 2014 Annual Report
 Basketball New Zealand 2014 Results Annual
 2014 Draw
 2014 Team By Team NBL Preview

National Basketball League (New Zealand) seasons
NBL